Protestants are a religious minority in Algeria. The small Christian community generally practices its faith without government interference. The Protestant Church of Algeria, a Reformed Church, likely has tens of thousands of followers. The Protestant Church of Algeria is one of only two officially recognized Christian organizations in the country.
The Minister of Religious Affairs has called the evangelical Church "dangerous". 

Missionary groups are permitted to conduct humanitarian activities without government interference as long as they are discreet and do not proselytize openly.  Algerian Christians are concentrated in Kabylie.
Since, 2006 proselytizing to Muslims can be punished with up to five years of prison. 

Algeria is included in the episcopal area of North Africa of the Anglican Diocese of Egypt, though there is only one current congregation in the country, Holy Trinity Anglican Church, in Algiers. The church mainly serves sub-Saharan African students from such areas as Zimbabwe, Zambia, Namibia, South Africa, Nigeria, Kenya, Equatorial Guinea, Ghana, Uganda and Burundi.

List of denominations
Denominations in Algeria include
Anglican Diocese of Egypt
Armée du Salut
Assemblées de Dieu
Eglise Adventiste du Séptieme Jour
Eglise Evangélique Copte
Eglise Protestante d'Algérie
Frères Larges
Mission Baptiste Evangélique
Mission Biblique de Ghardaia
Mission d'Afrique du Nord
Mission Evangélique au Sahara
Mission Evangélique de Médéa 
Mission Evangélique du Sahara
Mission Rolland

See also
Status of religious freedom in Algeria
Christianity in Algeria

References